Bombshells is a play by Australian playwright Joanna Murray-Smith.

Synopsis
Six monologues made famous by the diva Caroline O'Connor, exposing six women balancing their inner and outer lives with humour and often desperate cunning. They range in age from a feisty teenager to a 64-year-old widow yearning for the unexpected.

References

Australian plays
2004 plays

First Production
Bombshells was first presented by Melbourne Theatre Company at the Fairfax Theatre, Victorian Arts Centre, Melbourne, Australia, on 28 December 2001, with the following production team:
Performer: Caroline O'Connor
Director: Simon Phillips
Designer: Shaun Gurton
Composer: Elena Kats-Chernin
Lighting Designer: David Murray

This production was revived at the same venue from 26 February 2004 and transferred to the York Theatre, Seymour Centre, Sydney, Australia, from 30 April 2004.

A reduced version—consisting of four monologues—was presented as part of the Edinburgh Festival Fringe at the Assembly Rooms, Edinburgh, Scotland, from 6 August 2004. The performer again was Caroline O’Connor, directed by Simon Phillips.

This production—now consisting of all six monologues—transferred to the Arts Theatre, London, England, on 3 September 2004.

Four of the monologues from Bombshells were televised by the Australian Broadcasting Corporation in November 2003.